"One Man Parade" is a song written by James Taylor that was first released as the first track on his 1972 album One Man Dog.  It was also released as the second single from the album, following up on the Top 20 hit "Don't Let Me Be Lonely Tonight," after receiving significant airplay as an album track.  The single was issued twice with two different B-sides, "Hymn" and "Nobody But You." It did not achieve the same chart success as "Don't Let Me Be Lonely Tonight," peaking at #67 on the Billboard Hot 100.  It also charted on the Adult Contemporary chart in Canada, reaching #55.  In some regions, such as in Europe, it was released as the B-side of the single release of "One Morning in May."

Lyrics and music
Taylor said he had written "One Man Parade" during the year preceding the album release and he had begun playing it live in concert as early as the Fall of 1971.  Like "Don't Let Me Be Lonely Tonight," "One Man Parade" was recorded on a portable recording console at Taylor's home with his new bride Carly Simon in Martha's Vineyard, Massachusetts.  Simon, Carole King and Abigale Haness provided harmony vocals, as do Taylor's siblings Alex, Kate and Hugh.  Musicologist James Perone hears several Latin music elements in the song, including the instrumentation including congas, güiro and timbales. Russ Kunkel plays the congas on the song, in a performance Taylor biographer Mark Robowsky describes as "trippy."  Perone also finds Latin dance music influences in the way the song uses harmonic and bass ostinato, and finds the coda section to be similar to a montuno section of certain Latin music pieces that use a canto-montuno structure.

"One Man Parade" was originally intended to be the title track of the album, but Taylor changed the album title "for no particular reason" to One Man Dog, in reference to his shepherd dog who is mentioned in the song. To Robowsky, "One Man Parade" provides the theme for the album, calling it "a wistful desire to waste time on the simplest pleasures, walking a dog, pouring rain, checking out an occasional garbage can." Although Robowsky calls the song "upbeat" and Taylor's "most carefree yet: he notes that Taylor undercuts that mood with the line "I'm right good at holding on, holding on, holding on."  Perone also notes that the lyrics are more "upbeat" than most Taylor songs of this era, with the singer announcing his readiness to "step out on the town."  Donald Langis of L'Evangeline praised the word play of the lines "All I want is a little dog to be walking at my right hand / talking 'bout a one man dog / Nobody's friend but mine."  Langis interprets the dog as a metaphor for the type of friend Taylor is seeking.

Critical reception
Billboard rated "One Man Parade" as one of Taylor's best songs ever, saying that it is "full of melodic surprises" and "lyrical weirdness."  It also noted that although the song is "rollicking" it fits within Taylor's brand of gentle pop music.  Cash Box said that the "soft outing creates quite a mood that [radio] programmers will love," predicting that it would make the Top 10.  Rolling Stone critic Jon Landau praises how the song "starts right in and never lets up," and also praises Taylor's vocal performance for sounding like he was "standing while singing for the very first time.  Langis believed it had potential to be a hit.  Several reviewers praised Taylor's live performances of the song in the early 1970s.

"One Man Parade" was included on the 2003 compilation album Best of James Taylor.

Personnel
James Taylor – lead and backing vocals, acoustic guitar, harmonica
Danny Kortchmar – electric guitar, timbales
Russ Kunkel – congas
Peter Asher – guiro
Abigale Haness – backing vocals
Carole King – backing vocals
Carly Simon – backing vocals
Alex Taylor – backing vocals
Hugh Taylor – backing vocals
Kate Taylor – backing vocals

"Hymn"
"Hymn," also a song from One Man Dog, was the B-side of the "One Man Parade" single and was also the follow-up single in March 1973, backed with "Fanfare." Both "Hymn" and "Fanfare" were part of a suite of short songs on side 2 of the album.  Both songs were recorded at A&R Studios in New York.  Landau rated "Hymn" as the best song on the album, calling attention to the line "As a man and a woman stand alone in the light/Give us reason to be, like the sun on the sea."  Perone finds the song to be "interesting," particularly with its relationship to Taylor's life and certain Beatles influences.  Perone describes three distinct sections as having three different themes, all related to people trying to influence him: first religious zealots, second stoned-out drug users, and finally the love of a woman which really frees his soul.  Perone points out that the love of a woman likely references Simon, who he had recently married.  Perone finds Beatles influence in that it has thematic similarities to John Lennon's recent solo song "God."  According to Perone, both "God" and "Hymn" "[reference] the style of gospel music."  Langis regards the song as being semi-religious with lines such as "Let the winter wind blow/Where will we hide when it comes from inside?"  The single failed to chart.  Billboard described "Hymn" as "folksy-gospel arrangement in the best Taylor traditional, featuring strong piano with the singers voice taking the spotlight."  Cash Box called it a "pop oriented single certain to gain immediate top 40 acceptance across the country."

References

James Taylor songs
Songs written by James Taylor
1972 songs
1973 singles
Warner Records singles
Song recordings produced by Peter Asher